The 1935 Wayne Tartars football team represented Wayne University (later renamed Wayne State University) as an independent during the 1935 college football season. In their fourth year under head coach Joe Gembis, the Tartars compiled a 5–2–1 record and shut out four of eight opponents.

Fred Bens was the team captain. The team played its four home games at Kelsey Field located at the corner of Fourth and Lysander in Detroit and used an old house for lockers, showers, equipment and training rooms.

Schedule

References

Wayne
Wayne State Warriors football seasons
Wayne Tartars football